Uranothauma usambarae is a butterfly in the family Lycaenidae. It is found in Tanzania in the western Usambara Mountains.

References

Endemic fauna of Tanzania
Butterflies described in 1980
Uranothauma